Wang Jueyi ( Wáng Juéyī) was the founder of the Yiguan Dao "Unity Sect" of Taoism and claimed the 15th Taoist patriarchate

Life 
Wang Jueyi was born Wang Ximeng in 1821 in Qingzhou under the Qing Dynasty. On account of his orphanhood in very young age, Wang was brought up in his uncle's family. He had studied Taoism, Confucianism and Buddhism. Subsequently, he entered the Xiantiandao sect under the training of Yao Hetian.

After training, Wang returned to Qingzhou and founded his own temple, named Dongzhen Hall. In 1877, he claimed that God the Mother ( "The Unborn Mother") passed him the Mandate of Heaven, appointing him 15th patriarch of Taoism (with Zen Patriarch Bodhidharma as the first such patriarch).

The Xiantian Dao sect under Wang's leadership was significantly confucianized; practitioners needed to mainly follow the scripture of the Great Learning whereas Taoist practice such as asceticism and alchemy were abolished. The sect had been rapidly spread throughout the country until the Qing governmental crackdown against it in 1883. Many followers of Wang, including his son, were killed during this situation.

After the persecution, Wang Jueyi lived secretly until he died in 1884.

References 

1821 births
1884 deaths
I-Kuan Tao Patriarchs
Founders of new religious movements
People from Weifang